Makarom may refer to:
Jirawat Makarom (b. 1986), Thai footballer
Makarom, Iran, a village in South Khorasan Province, Iran